USS Traveler (SP-122) was an armed motorboat that served in the United States Navy as a patrol vessel from 1917 to 1919.
 
Traveler was built as a civilian motorboat in 1914 by the Mathews Boat Company at Port Clinton, Ohio. The U.S. Navy acquired Traveler from her owner, Mr. John D. Meyers of Miami, Florida, on 5 May 1917 for use as a patrol boat during World War I. She was commissioned on 14 July 1917 as USS Traveler (SP-122).

Assigned to the 7th Naval District, Traveler was based at Key West, Florida, from which she conducted patrols to protect American coastal trade routes from German submarine and naval mining incursions. Following the Armistice with Germany that ended the war on 11 November 1918, she continued to serve at Key West.

On 9 September 1919, Traveler and seven other section patrol boats anchored in the North Beach Basin at Key West were completely destroyed by a hurricane. The wreckage of the eight boats was hauled out immediately following the storm and burned.

Travelers name was stricken from the Navy List on 4 October 1919.

Notes

References

Department of the Navy Naval Historical Center Online Library of Selected Images: Civilian Ships: Traveler (American Motorboat, 1914) Served as USS Traveler (SP-122) in 1917-1919
NavSource Online: Section Patrol Craft Photo Archive: Traveler (SP 122)

Patrol vessels of the United States Navy
World War I patrol vessels of the United States
Ships built in Port Clinton, Ohio
1914 ships